This is a list of papal relatives created cardinal by a pope other than their relative. These creates are similar to cardinal-nephews but this list does not include cardinals included in the list of cardinal-nephews

List

Notes

References 
Thomson, John A.F. 1980. Popes and Princes, 1417-1517: Politics and Polity in the Late Medieval Church. Boston: George Allen & Unwin. .
Williams, George L. 2004. Papal Genealogy: The Families and Descendants of the Popes. McFarland. .
J. M. Brixius, Die Mitglieder des Kardinalkollegiums von 1130-1181, Berlin 1912
R. Hüls, Kardinäle, Klerus und Kirchen Roms: 1049-1130, Tübingen 1977
H.W. Klewitz, Reformpapsttum und Kardinalkolleg, Darmstadt 1957
B. Zenker, Die Mitglieder des Kardinalkollegiums von 1130 bis 1159, Würzburg 1964
K. Ganzer, Die Entwicklung des auswärtigen Kardinalats im hohen Mittelater, Tübingen 1963
W. Maleczek, Papst und Kardinalskolleg von 1191 bis 1216, Vienna 1984
K. Eubel, Hierarchia Catholica, vol. I-IX, Münster 1913
I.S. Robinson, The Papacy 1073-1198. Continuity and Innovation, Cambridge University Press 1990
A. Paravicini Bagliani, Cardinali di curia e "familiae" cardinalizie dal 1227 al 1254, 2 vols. Padova 1972

Papal relatives created